Himantolophus pseudalbinares is a species of footballfish, a type of anglerfish. The species is endemic to the southeast Atlantic Ocean.

References

Himantolophidae
Deep sea fish
Fish described in 1988